Ibrahim Shudzandin (born 27 August 1950) is a former Afghanistan wrestler, who competed at the 1980 Summer Olympic Games in the light-heavyweight event.

References

Wrestlers at the 1980 Summer Olympics
Afghan male sport wrestlers
Olympic wrestlers of Afghanistan
1950 births
Living people